Mauritius has attended sixteen Commonwealth Games, beginning in 1958 and missing only the 1986 Games. They had not won a medal until 1998, when they won four, including a gold in boxing.

Medals

List of Medalists

References

 
Nations at the Commonwealth Games